Tonbridge and Malling is a constituency in Kent represented in the House of Commons of the UK Parliament since 2015 by Tom Tugendhat, a Conservative. The constituency is located in Western Kent, in South East England.

History
The seat was created in 1974 from parts of the seats of Sevenoaks and Tonbridge.

Boundaries

1974–1983: The Urban District of Tonbridge, the Rural District of Malling, and part of the Rural District of Tonbridge.

1983–1997: The District of Tonbridge and Malling.

1997–2010: The Borough of Tonbridge and Malling wards of Birling, Leybourne and Ryarsh, Borough Green, Cage Green, Castle, East Malling, East Peckham, Hadlow, Higham, Hildenborough, Ightham, Judd, Long Mill, Medway, Oast, Trench, Vauxhall, Wateringbury, West Malling, West Peckham and Mereworth, and Wrotham, and the District of Sevenoaks wards of Edenbridge North, Edenbridge South, Leigh, Penshurst and Fordcombe, and Somerden.

2010–present: The Borough of Tonbridge and Malling wards of Borough Green and Long Mill, Cage Green, Castle, Downs, East Malling, East Peckham and Golden Green, Hadlow, Mereworth and West Peckham, Higham, Hildenborough, Ightham, Judd, Kings Hill, Medway, Trench, Vauxhall, Wateringbury, West Malling and Leybourne, and Wrotham, and the District of Sevenoaks wards of Cowden and Hever, Edenbridge North and East, Edenbridge South and West, Leigh and Chiddingstone Causeway, and Penshurst, Fordcombe and Chiddingstone.

The constituency is in the west of the county of Kent in south eastern England and includes about two-thirds of the Borough of Tonbridge and Malling (the remainder being in the Chatham and Aylesford constituency),and parts of Sevenoaks District.

Constituency profile
This safe Conservative seat is characterised by a large commuter population benefiting from good road and rail links to London. Light engineering, farming and local service industry sectors are represented alongside the public sector, skilled trades and some construction. Visitor attractions in the constituency include the River Medway, the Eden Valley Walk which covers Edenbridge and Penshurst, including Hever Castle, Chiddingstone Castle, Penshurst Place and Tonbridge Castle.  In this seat are numerous oast houses and remaining Wealden woodlands.

Residents' wealth and house prices are both higher than the UK average.

Members of Parliament

Elections

Elections in the 2010s

Elections in the 2000s

Elections in the 1990s

Elections in the 1980s

Elections in the 1970s

See also
List of parliamentary constituencies in Kent

References

Tonbridge and Malling
Parliamentary constituencies in Kent
Constituencies of the Parliament of the United Kingdom established in 1974